Viktor Rájek (born 15 April 1985) is a Slovak bobsledder. He competed in the two man and the four man events at the 2006 Winter Olympics.

References

External links
 

1985 births
Living people
Slovak male bobsledders
Olympic bobsledders of Slovakia
Bobsledders at the 2006 Winter Olympics
Sportspeople from Žilina